Anna Nikolaevna Zemtsova (Russian: Анна Николаевна Земцова (1893–1966), also known as Anna Li (Анна Ли), Anna Pudovkina or Anna Zemcova, was a Soviet silent film actress and film theorist. She was married to Vsevolod Pudovkin.

Career 
Anna Zemtsova started her career as an actress in the film of Khanzhonkov Studio Boulevard Slush (1918), directed by Boris Chaikovskii. She used the pseudonym Anna Li.  

Remains unknown why Anna Zemtsova used the pseudonym Anna Li. Film historians speculate that she took the name from one of the songs of Alexander Vertinsky that inspired the screenplay of Boulevard Slush. Zemtsova published three articles in the film newspaper Kino, focused on film theory that signed as Anna Li. She polemized with Lev Kuleshov about movement in films.

From 1922 to 1924, Zemtsova supported Vsevolod Pudovkin, which family was succumbing to tuberculosis. Pudovkin assured that she encouraged him for pursuing a career as a filmmaker. 

She designed a garment called "The Chameleon" that could transform into twenty outfits, included a coat and a dress. However, Zemtsova stopped her designing activities in 1924.

Anna Zemtsova appeared in the silent short film Chess Fever (1925) as the heroine, the wife of the hero who is chess addicted. The movie was directed by her husband Vsevolod Pudovkin. She played in the later films of Pudovkin Mother (1926) and The End of Saint Petersburg (1927).

She also played in the German film Klippen der Ehe (Dyk Rudensky, 1930), produced by Gestus-Film GmbH.

She married Pudovkin from 1924 until the death of the director in 1953.

Filmography 

 Chess Fever (1925)
 The End of St. Petersburg (1927)
 Mother (1926)

References 

1893 births
1966 deaths
Soviet silent film actresses